North Boondall railway station is located on the Shorncliffe line in Queensland, Australia.  It is one of two stations serving the Brisbane suburb of Boondall, the other being Boondall station.

History
North Boondall station opened in 1882 as Cabbage Tree Creek, it was later renamed Nudgee College, then renamed as Boondall in 1923 until 1986.  The station was renamed North Boondall upon opening of the Brisbane Entertainment Centre in 1986

Services
North Boondall station is served by all stops Shorncliffe line services from Shorncliffe to Roma Street, Cannon Hill, Manly and Cleveland

Services by platform

References

External links

North Boondall station Queensland Rail
North Boondall station Queensland's Railways on the Internet
[ North Boondall station] TransLink travel information

Railway stations in Brisbane
Boondall, Queensland